Nasser Sherian (Arabic:ناصر شريان) (born 11 November 1994) is a Qatari footballer who plays as a winger .

External links

References

Qatari footballers
1994 births
Living people
Al Ahli SC (Doha) players
Al-Rayyan SC players
Al-Shahania SC players
Al Kharaitiyat SC players
Qatar Stars League players
Qatari Second Division players
Association football wingers